A list of township-level divisions of Qinghai, China (PRC): After province, prefecture, and county-level divisions, township-level divisions constitute the formal fourth-level administrative divisions of the PRC. The townships of Qinghai are divided into subdistricts, towns, townships, and ethnic townships.

Xining

Chengzhong District
Subdistricts:
 Renmin Street Subdistrict, Nantan Subdistrict, Cangmen Street Subdistrict, Lirang Street Subdistrict, Yinma Street Subdistrict, Nanchuan East Road Subdistrict, Nanchuan West Road Subdistrict

Town:
 Zhongzhai.

Chengdong District
Subdistricts:
 Dongguan Street Subdistrict, Qingzhen Alley Subdistrict, Dazhong Street Subdistrict, Zhoujiaquan Subdistrict, Huochezhan Subdistrict, Bayi Road Subdistrict, Linjiaya Subdistrict

Towns:
 Lejiawan, Yunjiakou

Chengxi District
Subdistricts:
 Xiguan Avenue Subdistrict, Guchengtai Subdistrict, Hutai Subdistrict, Shengli Road Subdistrict, Nanchuan West Road Subdistrict

Town:
 Pengjiazhai

Chengbei District
Subdistricts:
 Chaoyang Subdistrict, Xiaoqiao Street Subdistrict, Mafang Subdistrict

Towns:
 Baoziwan, Nianlipu.

Huangyuan County
Towns:
 Chengguan, Dahua

Townships:
 Dongxia Township, Heping Township, Bohang Tonwship, Shenzhong Township (ཞིང་སྐྱོང་, 申中乡), Bayan Township, Sizhai Township

Ethnic Township:
 Riyue Tibetan Ethnic Township (ཉི་མ་ཟླ་བ་, 日月藏族乡)

Huangzhong County
Subdistricts:
Kangchuan Subdistrict and Ganhe Industrial Park

Towns:
 Lusha'er (རུ་གསར་, 鲁沙尔镇), Duoba (མདོ་བ་, 多巴镇), Xibao, Shangxinzhuang, Tianjiazhai, Ganhetan, Gonghe, Lanlongkou (ལམ་ལུང་, 拦隆口镇), Shangwuzhuang, Lijiashan,

Townships:
 Tumenguan Township, Haizigou Township

Ethnic Townships:
 Qunjia Tibetan Ethnic Township, Handong Hui Ethnic Township, Dacai Hui Ethnic Township

Datong County
Towns:
 Qiaotou, Chengguan, Ta'er, Dongxia, Huanhjiazhai, Changning, Jingyang, Duolin, Xinzhuang

Townships:
 Qinglin Township, Qingshan Township, Xunrang Township, Jile Township, Shishan Township, Baoku Township, Xiegou Township, Liangjiao Township, Hualin Township

Ethnic Townships:
 Xianghua Tibetan Ethnic Township, Shuobei Tibetan Ethnic Township

Haidong

Ping'an District
Towns:
 Ping'an, Xiaoxia, Sanhe

Township:
 Sitai Township

Ethnic Townships:
Hongshuiquan Hui Ethnic Township, Shihuiyao Hui Ethnic Township, Gucheng Hui Ethnic Township, Shagou Hui Ethnic Township, Bazanggou Hui Ethnic Township

Ledu District
Towns:
 Nianbo, Yurun, Shoule, Gaomiao, Hongshui, Gaodian, Qutan

Townships:
 Gonghe Township, Zhongling Township, Lijia Township, Luhua Township, Maying Townshipi, Machang Township, Putai Township, Fengdui Township, Chengtai Township,

Ethnic Townships:
 Xiaying Tibetan Ethnic Township, Zhongba Tibetan Ethnic Township, Dala Tibetan Ethnic Township

Minhe County
Towns:
 Chuankou, Gushan, Maying, Guanting, Bazhou, Manping, Li'erbao, Xiamen

Townships:
 Machangyuan Township, Beishan Township, Songshu Township, Xigou Township, Zongbao Township, Longzhi Township, Dazhuang Township, Zhuandao Township, Qianhe Township, Gangou Township, Zhongchuan Township, Hetaozhuang Township, Xinmin Township

Ethnic Township:
 Xing'er Tibetan Ethnic Township

Huzhu County
Towns:
 Weiyuan, Danma (འདན་མ་, 丹麻镇), Gaozhai, Nanmenxia, Jiading (རྒྱ་ཏེག་, 加定镇), Tangchuan, Wushi, Wufeng

Townships:
 Taizi Township, Xishan Township, Hongyazigou Township, Halazhigou Township, Dongshan Township, Donghe Township, Donggou Township, Linchuan Township, Caijiabao Township

Ethnic Townships:
 Bazha Tibetan Ethnic Township (བ་བཟའ་, 巴扎藏族乡), Songduo Tibetan Ethnic Township (སུམ་མདོ་, 松多藏族乡)

Hualong County
Towns:
 Bayan, Qunke (ཚའཱི་མགུར་, 群科镇), Yashiga (ཡར་ག་, 牙什尕镇), Gandu (ཀ་མདོ་, 甘都镇), Zhaba (རྩ་བ་, 扎巴镇), Angsiduo (ནང་སྟོད་, 昂思多镇)

Townships:
 Chuma Township (ཆུ་དམར་, 初麻乡), Ertang Township, Xiejiatan Township, Dehenglong Township (སྟག་ལུང་, 德恒隆乡), Shalianbao Township, Ashennu Township (ཨ་སྔོན་, 阿什奴乡), Dashicang Township (སྟག་ཚང་, 石大仓乡)

Ethnic Townships:
 Shongshen Tibetan Ethnic Township (གཤོང་ཤན་, 雄先藏族乡), Tsaphug Tibetan Ethnic Township (ཚ་ཕུག་, 查甫藏族乡), Thagya Tibetan Ethnic Township (ཐ་རྒྱ་, 塔加藏族乡), Serzhong Tibetan Ethnic Township (གསེར་གཞོང་, 金源藏族乡)

Xunhua County
Towns:
 Jishi, Baizhuang, Jiezi

Townships:
 Qingshui Township, Chahan Duzi Township,

Ethnic Townships:
 Dowei Tibetan Ethnic Township (རྡོ་སྦིས་, 道帏藏族乡), Kangtsa Tibetan Ethnic Township (རྐང་ཚ་, 岗察藏族乡), Bindo Tibetan Ethnic Township (བིས་མདོ་, 文都藏族乡), Karing Tibetan Ethnic Township (ཀ་རིང་, 尕楞藏族乡)

Haibei

Haiyan County
Towns:
 Sanjiaocheng, Xihai

Townships:
 Jintan Township (གསེར་ཐང་, 金滩乡), Qinghaihu Township, Ganzihe Township

Ethnic Township:
 Halejing Mongol Ethnic Township

Qilian County
Towns:
 Babao, Ebao, Mole (མུ་རི་, 默勒镇)

Townships:
 Zamashi Townships (རྫ་མ་སྐེ, 扎麻什乡), Aruo Townshop, Yeniugou Township (འབྲོང་ལུང་, 野牛沟乡), Yanglong Township

Gangca County
Towns:
 Shaliuhe, Ha'ergai (ཧར་དགེ, 哈尔盖镇)

Townships:
 Yike Wulan Township, Quanji Township (ཁྱོན་རྒྱས་, 泉吉乡), Ji'ermeng Township

Menyuan County
Towns:
 Haomen, Qingshiju, Quankou, Dongchuan

Townships:
 Beishan Township, Malian Township, Xitan Township, Yintian Township, Xianmi Township (སེམས་ཉིད།, 仙米乡), Zhugu Township (འབྲུ་གུ་, 珠固乡), Sujitan Township

Ethnic Township:
 Huangcheng Mongol Ethnic Township

Haixi

Delingha City

Subdistricts:
 Hexi Subdistrict, Hedong Subdistrict, Train station Subdistrict
Towns:
 Gahai, Huaitou Tala, Keluke
Township:
 Xuji Township

Golmud City
Subdistricts:

 Kunlunlu Subdistrict, Jinfenglu Subdistrict, Hexi Subdistrict, Huanghelu Subdistrict, Xizanglu Subdistrict

Towns:
 Tanggula (གདང་ལ་), Guole Mude

Townships:
 Wutu Meiren Township, Dagele Township

Mangnai
Towns:
Mangnai, Huatugou, Lenghu

Ulan County
Towns:
 Xiligou, Chaka (ཚྭ་ཁ་, 茶卡镇), Keke, Tongpu (མཐོན་པོ་, 铜普镇)

Dulan County
Towns:
 Chahan Wusu, Xiangride, Xiariha, Zongjia

Townships:
 Reshui Township (ཆུ་ཁོལ་, 热水乡), Xiangjia Township, Gouli Township, Balong Township

Tianjun County
Towns:
 Xinyuan, Muli (མུ་རི་, 木里镇), Jianghe

Townships:
 Kharmar Township (མཁར་དམར་, 快尔玛乡), Drugkyung Township (འབྲུག་ཁྱུང་, 舟群乡), Dragmar Township (བྲག་དམར་, 织合玛乡), Suli Township, Sengge Township (སེང་གེ་, 生格乡), Yagkeng Township (གཡག་ཁེངས་, 阳康乡), Lungmar Township (ལུང་དམར་, 龙门乡)

Da Qaidam Administrative Zone
Towns:
Qaidam, Xitieshan

Hainan

Gonghe County
Towns: 

 Daotanghe (倒淌河镇), Heimanhe (黑马河乡), Jiangxigou (江西沟乡), Longyangxia (龙羊峡镇), Qiabuqia (恰卜恰镇), Shinaihai (石乃亥镇), Tanggemu (塘格木镇)

Townships:

 Niandi Township (廿地乡), Qieji Township (切吉乡), Shazhuyu Township (沙珠玉乡), Tiegai Township (铁盖乡)

Tongde County
Towns:

 Gabasongduo (尕巴松多镇), Tanggu (唐谷镇)

Townships:

 Bagou Township (巴沟乡), Hebei Township (河北乡), Xiuma Township (秀麻乡)

Guide County
Towns:

 Changmu (常牧镇), Hexi (河西镇), Heyin (河阴镇), Laxiwa (拉西瓦镇)

Townships:

 Garang Township (尕让乡), Hedong Township (河东乡)

Ethnic Townships:

 Xinjie Hui Ethnic Township (新街回族乡)

Xinghai County
Towns:

 Heka (河卡镇), Qushi'an (曲什安镇), Ziketan (子科滩镇)

Townships:

 Longzang Township (龙藏乡), Tangnaihai Township (唐乃亥乡), Wenquan Township (温泉乡), Zhongtie Township (中铁乡)

Guinan County
Towns: 

 Guomaying (过马营镇), Mangqu (茫曲镇), Senduo (森多镇)

Townships:

 Mangla Township (茫拉乡), Shagou Township (沙沟乡), Taxiu Township (塔秀乡)

Huangnan

Tongren County
Towns:

 Bao'an (保安镇), Duowa (多哇镇), Longwu (隆务镇)

Townships:

 Guashize Township (瓜什则乡), Huangnaihai Township (黄乃亥乡), Jiawu Township (加吾乡), Lancai Township (兰采乡), Nianduhu Township (年都乎乡), Qukuhu Township (曲库乎乡), Shuangpengxi Township (双朋西乡), Zhamao Township (扎毛乡)

Jainca County
Towns:

 Kanbula (坎布拉镇), Kangyang (康扬镇), Maketang (马克堂镇)

Townships:

 Angla Township (昂拉乡), Cuozhou Township (措周乡), Dangshun Township (当顺乡), Jiajia Township (贾加乡), Jianzhatan Township (尖扎滩乡), Nengke Township (能科乡)

Zêkog County
Towns:

 Heri (和日镇), Maixiu (麦秀镇), Ningxiu (宁秀镇), Zequ (泽曲镇)

Townships:

 Duohemao Township (多禾茂乡), Wangjia Township (王加乡), Xibusha Township (西卜沙乡)

Henan County
Towns:

 Youganning (优干宁镇), Ningmute (宁木特镇)

Townships:

 Duosong Township (多松乡), Kesheng Township (柯生乡), Sai'erlong Township (赛尔龙乡)

Golog

Maqên County
Towns:

 Dawu (大武镇), Lajia (拉加镇),

Townships:

 Dangluo Township (当洛乡), Dawu Township (大武乡), Dongqinggou Township (东倾沟乡), Xiaduwu Township (下大武乡), Xueshan Township (雪山乡), Youyun Township (优云乡)

Baima County
Town:

 Sailaitang (赛来塘镇)

Townships:

 Daka Township (达卡乡), Dengta Township (灯塔乡), Duogongma Township (多贡麻乡), Jiangritang Township (江日堂乡), Jika Township (吉卡乡), Makehe Township (马可河乡), Ya'ertang Township (亚尔堂乡). Zhiqin Township (知钦乡)

Gadê County
Town:

 Kequ (柯曲镇)

Townships:

 Ganglong Township (岗龙乡), Jiangqian Township (江千乡), Qingzhen Township (青珍乡), Shanggongma Township (上贡麻乡), Xiagongma Township (下贡麻乡), Xiazangke Township (下藏科乡)

Darlag County
Town:

 Jimai (吉迈镇)

Townships:

 De'ang Township (德昂乡), Jianshe Township (建设乡), Manzhang Township (满掌乡), Moba Township (莫坝乡), Sangrima Township (桑日麻乡), Shanghongke Township (上红科乡), Tehetu Township (特合土乡), Wosai Township (窝赛乡), Xiahongke Township (下红科乡)

Jigzhi County
Town:

 Zhiqing Sonduo (智青松多镇)

Townships:

 Baiyu Township (白玉乡), Mentang Township (门堂乡), Suoha Rima Township (索呼日麻乡), Wa'eryi Township (哇尔依乡), Wasai Township (哇赛乡)

Madoi County
Towns:

 Huashixia (花石峡镇), Machaii (玛查理镇)

Townships:

 Huanghe Township (黄河乡), Zhalinghu Township (扎陵湖乡)

Yushu

Yushu City

Subdistricts:
 Jieguzhen Subdistrict, Zhaxike Subdistrict, Xihang Subdistrict, Xinzhai Subdistrict

Towns: 
 Longbao, Laxiu

Townships:
 Zhongda Township, Batang Township, Xiaosu'mang Township, Shanglaxiu Township, Haxiu Township, Anchong Township

Zadoi County (Zaduo County)

Town: 
 Sahuteng

Townships:
 Angsai Township, Jieduo Township, Aduo Township, Sulu Township, Chadan Township, Moyun Township, Zhaqing Township

Chindu County (Chenduo County)

Towns: 
 Chengwen, Xiewu, Zhaduo, Qingshuihe, Zhenqin

Townships:
 Gaduo Township, Labu Township

Zhidoi County (Zhiduo County)

Town: 
 Jiajiboluoge

Townships:
 Suojia Township, Zhahe Township, Duocai Township, Zhiqu Township, Lixin Township

Nangchen County (Nangqian County)

Town: 
 Xiangda

Townships:
 Baizha Township, Jiqu Township, Niangla Township, Maozhuang Township, Juela Township, Dongba Township, Gayang Township, Jinisai Township, Zhexiao Township

Qumarlêb County (Qumalai County)

Town: 
 Yuegai

Townships:
 Bagan Township, Qiuzhi Township, Yege Township, Maduo Township, Qumahe Township

See also 

 List of administrative divisions of Qinghai, for prefectures and counties only

References

Qinghai
 
Townships